Danby is an unincorporated community in southeast Jefferson County, in the U.S. state of Missouri.

The community is adjacent to the west side of I-55 approximately nine miles southeast of Festus. Isle du Bois Creek, which forms the border between Jefferson and Ste. Genevieve counties, flows past approximately 1.5 miles south of the community.

History
A post office called Danby was established in 1883, and remained in operation until 1955. It is unknown why the name Danby was applied to this community.

References

Unincorporated communities in Jefferson County, Missouri
Unincorporated communities in Missouri